Cindy Milstein is an American anarchist activist based in Brooklyn. They are an Institute for Anarchist Studies board member.

They have also been involved with the Institute for Social Ecology, and are currently a board member with the Institute for Anarchist Studies and a co-organizer of the Renewing the Anarchist Tradition conference. Milstein speaks regularly in public, at anarchist conferences and bookfairs as well as radical spaces, including the Finding Our Roots conference, the Unschooling Oppression conference, the Montreal Anarchist Bookfair, the Bay Area Bookfair, the New York Anarchist Book Fair, and Left Forum, among others. Milstein was an active member of Occupy Philly.

Works 

 Anarchism and Its Aspirations (2010)
 There Is Nothing So Whole as a Broken Heart (2021)

See also

John Petrovato
Chuck W. Morse
Ashanti Alston
Murray Bookchin

References

Year of birth missing (living people)
Living people
American anarchists
American non-fiction writers
American political writers
American women writers
People from East Lansing, Michigan
Activists from Michigan